The 2002 Porsche Michelin Supercup season was the 10th Porsche Supercup season. The races were all supporting races in the 2002 Formula One season. It travelled to 10 circuits across Europe and a double-header at Indianapolis, USA. The 2002 season was the first season that cars did not run on Pirelli tyres, instead running on Michelin tyres in the first year of an eternal control-tyre deal.

Teams and drivers

Race calendar and results

1 – Race was combined with Supercup and German Porsche Carrera Cup drivers.

2 – Marc Lieb recorded the overall fastest lap of the race but drove for the German series.

Championship standings

References

External links
The Porsche Mobil 1 Supercup website
Porsche Mobil 1 Supercup Online Magazine

Porsche Supercup seasons
Porsche Supercup